The women's 4x100 metre medley relay event at the 11th FINA World Swimming Championships (25m) took place 14 December 2012 at the Sinan Erdem Dome.

Records
Prior to this competition, the existing world and championship records were as follows.

No new records were set during this competition.

Results

Heats

18 teams participated in 2 heats.

Final

The final was held at 21:16.

References

External links
 2012 FINA World Swimming Championships (25 m): Women's 4 x 100 metre medley entry list, from OmegaTiming.com.

Medley relay 4x100 metre, women's
World Short Course Swimming Championships
2012 in women's swimming